Viktor Bruthans (born 9 November 1979) is a former professional tennis player from Slovakia.

Biography
Bruthans was born in the Czechoslovakian town of Kyjov, which is now part of the Czech Republic.

At the 2005 Summer Universiade in Izmir, he won bronze medals for Slovakia in both the men's doubles and mixed doubles events.

His professional career was spent on the Futures and Challenger circuits. As a singles player he reached 238 in the world, with Futures titles in India, Ukraine and Nigeria, as well as a runners-up trophy at the 2005 Togliatti Challenger. He won two Challenger titles in doubles.

Bruthans made several attempts to qualify for the main draw of a Grand Slam tournament, most notably at the 2005 Australian Open, where he reached the final round of qualifying.

In 2006 he represented Slovakia in a Davis Cup tie against Chile in Rancagua. The tie, a World Group opener, was secured by Chile after the doubles match, which gave Bruthans an opportunity as the reverse singles were dead rubbers. He lost his match in straight sets to Paul Capdeville.

Challenger titles

Doubles: (2)

See also
List of Slovakia Davis Cup team representatives

References

External links
 
 
 

1979 births
Living people
Slovak male tennis players
Universiade medalists in tennis
People from Kyjov
Universiade bronze medalists for Slovakia
Medalists at the 2005 Summer Universiade
Sportspeople from the South Moravian Region